Elias Fritjof Grænge Sørensen (born 18 September 1999) is a Danish professional footballer who plays for Esbjerg fB, as a striker.

Club career
Born in Sjunkeby, after playing youth football for Danish club HB Køge, Sørensen became Køge's youngest ever player after coming on as a late substitute against Silkeborg on 8 May 2016 at the age of 16. In the summer of 2016, following a trial period, Sørensen signed for Newcastle United. In January 2019, Sørensen signed on loan for Blackpool. Whilst with Blackpool he continued to also play for the Newcastle under-23 team. Despite Blackpool manager Terry McPhillips suggesting he would play more games, he was recalled by Newcastle in March after making just one appearance for the club.

He then joined League Two side Carlisle United on 16 August 2019 on a loan deal until the end of the 2019–20 season. The loan was cut short on 20 December 2019 by Newcastle.

In October 2020 he moved on loan to Dutch club Almere City.

He returned to Denmark in July 2021, signing for Esbjerg.

International career
Sørensen has represented Denmark at under-17 and under-19 international youth levels, and has also been involved with the under-21 team.

References

1999 births
Living people
Danish men's footballers
Danish expatriate men's footballers
Association football forwards
Denmark youth international footballers
Denmark under-21 international footballers
HB Køge players
Newcastle United F.C. players
Blackpool F.C. players
Carlisle United F.C. players
Almere City FC players
Esbjerg fB players
Danish 1st Division players
English Football League players
Danish expatriate sportspeople in England
Expatriate footballers in England
Danish expatriate sportspeople in the Netherlands
Expatriate footballers in the Netherlands